The 1989 Individual Ice Speedway World Championship was the 24th edition of the World Championship  The Championship was held on the first weekend in March, 1989 in the Medeu stadium in Alma Ata, Kazakhstan in the Soviet Union. 

The winner was Nikolai Nichenko of the Soviet Union.

Classification

See also 
 1989 Individual Speedway World Championship in classic speedway
 1989 Team Ice Racing World Championship

References 

Ice speedway competitions
World